Kim Beom-Jun  (born 14 July 1988) is a South Korean footballer who plays as a midfielder for Pohang Steelers in the K-League.

External links 

1988 births
Living people
Association football midfielders
South Korean footballers
Pohang Steelers players
Gimcheon Sangmu FC players
K League 1 players